Philip Smith (1885 – 29 September 1918) was an English footballer who played at centre-forward for Burslem Port Vale, Crewe Alexandra, Chelsea, Burnley, and Stalybridge Celtic. He was killed in action during World War I.

Career
Smith played for Knutton, before joining Burslem Port Vale in August 1905. After making his debut in a 3–1 defeat to Lincoln City at Sincil Bank on 2 September, he became a regular in the first team. He got his first League goal seven days later, in a 4–3 win over Chesterfield at the Athletic Ground. He claimed eight goals in 25 Second Division appearances in the 1905–06 season. However, he was later released, most likely in the summer of 1906. He later played for Crewe Alexandra, before joining Chelsea for a £250 fee in April 1910. He played one First Division match for the club, a 1–0 defeat at Bristol City on 16 April 1910. He left Chelsea in OCtober 1910 and went on to play for Burnley and Stalybridge Celtic.

Personal life
Smith was the older brother of footballer Joe Smith. He served as a gunner in the Royal Field Artillery during World War I and was killed in action whilst fighting in the Western Front on 29 September 1918.

Career statistics
Sourced by

References

1885 births
1918 deaths
Sportspeople from Newcastle-under-Lyme
English footballers
Association football forwards
Port Vale F.C. players
Crewe Alexandra F.C. players
Chelsea F.C. players
Burnley F.C. players
Stalybridge Celtic F.C. players
English Football League players
Royal Field Artillery soldiers
British Army personnel of World War I
British military personnel killed in World War I